Plesanemma is a genus of moths in the family Geometridae erected by Peter B. McQuillan in 1984. Both species are found in Australia.

Species
Plesanemma fucata (Felder & Rogenhofer, 1875) Queensland
Plesanemma altafucata McQuillan, 1984 Tasmania

References

Nacophorini